700 East is a streetcar stop in the Sugar House neighborhood of Salt Lake City, Utah, in the United States, served by Utah Transit Authority's (UTA) S Line (previously known as the Sugar House Streetcar). The S Line provides service from Sugar House to the city of South Salt Lake (where it connects with UTA's TRAX light rail system).

Description 
The 700 East stop is located at 2210 South 700 East, just west of South 700 East (SR-71). The side platform is located on the north side of the single set of tracks. There is no parking available nearby; street-side parking is not permitted along the adjacent section of South 700 East. The stop began service on December 8, 2013, and is operated by Utah Transit Authority.

References 

UTA streetcar stops
Railway stations in the United States opened in 2013
Railway stations in Salt Lake City
2013 establishments in Utah